The Chicago Film Critics Association Award for Best Animated Feature is one of the annual film awards by the Chicago Film Critics Association since 2007.

Winners

2000s

2010s

2020s

See also
Academy Award for Best Animated Feature
Golden Globe Award for Best Animated Feature Film

References

Animated Film
Awards for best animated feature film
Awards established in 2007